Classic Text Adventure Masterpieces of Infocom is a collection of 33 computer games from interactive fiction pioneer Infocom, and the top 6 winners of the 1995 Interactive Fiction Competition, released in 1996. All 39 games are combined on a single cross-platform CD-ROM, which also includes PDFs of all the Infocom games' instructions, maps, and hint booklets.

Infocom was closed in 1989 by its then-parent company Activision. Still holding the copyright to nearly all the past Infocom titles, Activision bundled them together in this collection, following up the earlier Lost Treasures of Infocom series. The Infocom games included are:

 Arthur: The Quest for Excalibur
 Ballyhoo
 Beyond Zork
 Border Zone
 Bureaucracy
 Cutthroats
 Deadline
 Enchanter
 Hollywood Hijinx
 Infidel
 Journey
 Leather Goddesses of Phobos
 The Lurking Horror
 A Mind Forever Voyaging
 Moonmist
 Nord and Bert Couldn't Make Head or Tail of It
 Planetfall
 Plundered Hearts
 Seastalker
 Sherlock: The Riddle of the Crown Jewels
 Sorcerer
 Spellbreaker
 Starcross
 Stationfall
 Suspect
 Suspended
 Trinity
 Wishbringer
 The Witness
 Zork I
 Zork II
 Zork III
 Zork Zero

The Interactive Fiction Competition winners included are:

 A Change in the Weather
 The Magic Toyshop
 The Mind Electric
 The One That Got Away
 Toonesia
 Uncle Zebulon's Will

The collection includes all the contents of the two Lost Treasures of Infocom collections except for The Hitchhiker's Guide to the Galaxy and James Clavell's Shōgun. The rights to these two games, based on novels by Douglas Adams and James Clavell, respectively, had reverted to the novels' authors. Unlike the Lost Treasures collections, though, Masterpieces included the adult game Leather Goddesses of Phobos.

Reception
A reviewer for Next Generation scored the compilation a perfect five out of five stars. He praised the "functionally comprehensive" selection of Infocom games and the six Interactive Fiction Competition games, estimated the total playtime at 1,200 hours minimum, and said the gameplay "represents the pinnacle of well written, interactive fiction."

References

External links

Infocom games
1996 video games
DOS games
Classic Mac OS games
Activision video game compilations
Video games developed in the United States